Hugh Meikle (25 December 1940 – 19 February 2016) was a Welsh curler and curling coach.

He started curling in Toronto, Ontario in late 1960s.

He was a founder of Welsh Curling Association in 1974.

Teams

Record as a coach of national teams

Personal life
His wife Elizabeth is a curler and coach; his sons Adrian and Jamie are also a curlers.

References

External links

1940 births
2016 deaths
Sportspeople from Birkenhead
Welsh male curlers
Welsh curling coaches
English emigrants to Canada
Welsh emigrants to Canada
Curlers from Toronto